This list of tallest buildings in Hyderabad lists the high-rises in Hyderabad, India.

Hyderabad is witnessing a massive construction boom around its IT corridor with several high-rise & skyscraper proposals getting approvals. As of January 2022, Lodha Bellezza Towers 3, 4 & 5 (45 floors, 153 metres) are the tallest completed buildings of Hyderabad. The tallest project under-construction is SAS Crown in Kokapet - 3 towers of 58 floors with a proposed height of 228 metres. All the data mentioned in the below lists are from verified government sources.

Tallest buildings

This lists ranks buildings in Hyderabad that are at least 100 metres (328 ft) in height . Only completed buildings and under-construction buildings that have topped out are included.

Tallest Under Construction 
Buildings that are only approved or proposed are not included in this table.

Approved and Proposed 

See also

 List of tallest buildings in India
 List of tallest buildings in Asia
 List of tallest buildings in the World
 List of tallest buildings in different cities in India

References

External links
 CTBUH Hyderabad

Hyderabad
Buildings and structures in Hyderabad, India